Nrrd ("nearly raw raster data") is a library and file format for the representation and processing of n-dimensional raster data. It was developed by Gordon Kindlmann to support scientific visualization and image processing applications.

Utah Nrrd Utilities

The command-line tool unu (Utah Nrrd Utilities) is used for the manipulation and management of nrrd files.

References

Graphics file formats
C (programming language) libraries
Free software programmed in C
Image processing software